Burnaby News Leader was a community newspaper in Burnaby, British Columbia founded in 1989. It closed operations in 2015.

Background
In 2009, it was awarded Newspaper of the Year by Suburban Newspapers of America.

In 2015, Black Press sold the News Leader to Glacier Media. In September 2015, Glacier announced the closure of the News Leader, New Westminster News Leader, and Tri-Cities Now as of October 1.

See also
List of newspapers in Canada
Burnaby Now

References

External links
Burnaby News Leader  – Official website.

Black Press newspapers
Mass media in Burnaby
Defunct newspapers published in British Columbia
Newspapers established in 1989
Publications disestablished in 2015
1989 establishments in British Columbia
2015 disestablishments in British Columbia
Weekly newspapers published in British Columbia